is a hydroelectric dam in Ibigawa, in the Gifu Prefecture of Japan, completed in 1939.

References

Dams in Gifu Prefecture
Dams completed in 1939